Abbeyard is an unpopulated region within the Alpine Shire, in the Hume region of Victoria, Australia, located in the north-east part of the state. It lies north of the Alpine National Park.

External links
Alpine Shire Council official website
Metlink local public transport map
Link to Land Victoria interactive maps

References 

Towns in Victoria (Australia)
Alpine Shire
Victorian Alps